Fort Venango, a small British fort built in 1760 near the present-day site of Franklin, Pennsylvania, replaced Fort Machault, a French fort built at the confluence of French Creek and the Allegheny River. The French burned their fort in 1759 after abandoning it. They retreated to the north after learning of the French surrender to the British of Fort Niagara, near the end of the French and Indian War. 

About June 16, 1763, during Pontiac's War, this British fort was captured by Seneca and Mingo warriors. They killed the 12 to 16 soldiers of the fort garrison outright, except for the commander, Lieutenant Francis Gordon. The warriors forced him to write a letter detailing why the Indians had risen against the British.  He recorded two complaints: that the British had not supplied the tribes with sufficient gunpowder for the past two years and that the English, contrary to their treaty promises, were keeping forts, and building new forts, in what the Crown had proclaimed to be reserved as exclusively Indian territory west of the Appalachian Mountains.  The warriors subjected Gordon to ritual slow torture and burned him to death at the stake. They burnt Fort Venango to the ground.

The British had named the fort after the nearby Lenape village, Venango. It was occupied by a portion of the people who spoke the Munsee dialect of the Delaware (or Lenape) language.

References

 Charles M. Stotz, Outposts of the War for Empire: The French and English in Western Pennsylvania: Their Armies, Their Forts, Their People, 1749-1764 (Pittsburgh, PA: University of Pittsburgh Press, 1985).

External links
Historical marker in Pennsylvania

Government buildings completed in 1760
Infrastructure completed in 1760
Venango
Buildings and structures in Venango County, Pennsylvania
Battles in Pennsylvania
Pontiac's War
Venango
Venango